Doktor Martin is a German television comedy drama series produced by production company Phoenix Film for the German television channel ZDF. The first series was broadcast in July 2007, the second in July 2009.

The series is an adaptation of the British television series Doc Martin, which is broadcast on the British television channel ITV.

Synopsis
Axel Milberg plays Dr. Martin Helling, a vascular surgeon from Berlin who hangs up his job because of a phobia of blood, so he moves to the East Frisian village of Neuharlingersiel for a new beginning. However, everything is very different from his city life; there is no hassle in the practice, patients prefer to stay for a cup of tea. The comedy of the series is mostly centred on the peculiarities of the villagers.

See also
List of German television series

External links
 

2007 German television series debuts
2009 German television series endings
Doc Martin
German comedy-drama television series
German drama television series
German-language television shows
German television series based on British television series
ZDF original programming